{{DISPLAYTITLE:C2HNO2}}
The molecular formula C2HNO2 (molar mass: 71.03 g/mol, exact mass: 71.0007 u) may refer to:

 Carbonocyanidic acid
 Formyl cyanate
 (Hydroxyimino)ethenone HONCCO
 2-Nitrosoethenone ONC(H)CO
 Oximide